Janolidae is a family of sea slugs, nudibranchs, marine gastropod molluscs, in the clade Euthyneura.

Genera 
Genera in the family Janolidae include:
 Antiopella Hoyle, 1902
 Bonisa Gosliner, 1981 
 Galeojanolus Miller, 1971 
 Janolus Bergh, 1884    
Genera brought into synonymy
 Janus Vérany, 1844: synonym of Janolus Bergh, 1884

References 

Nudibranchia
Gastropod families